Smenospongia echina is a species of sea sponge in the class Demospongiae. The scientific name of the species was first validly published in 1934 by Max Walker de Laubenfels, as Polyfibrospongia echina.

See also
Smenospongia aurea
5-Bromo-DMT
Hallucinogenic fish

References

Dictyoceratida
Animals described in 1934